The Kurnool Area Development Authority (KUDA) is an urban planning agency in the Kurnool district of the Indian state of Andhra Pradesh. It was constituted on 1 February 2016, under Andhra Pradesh Metropolitan Region and Urban Development Authority Act, 2016 with the headquarters located at Kurnool.

Jurisdiction 
It covers 123 villages in 9 mandals of Kurnool districts. Kurnool Municipal Corporation, Nandyal Municipality, Dhone Municipality, Bethamcherla Nagar Panchayat and Gudur nagar panchayat are the ulbs present in KUDA.

References 

Kurnool district
Urban development authorities of Andhra Pradesh
State urban development authorities of India